The Brule Formation was deposited between 33 and 30 million years ago, roughly the Rupelian age (Oligocene).  It occurs as a subunit of the White River Formation in Nebraska, Colorado, North Dakota, South Dakota, and Wyoming.

It is a sequence of fine grained clastic rocks (claystones, mudstones, siltstones) interbedded with freshwater carbonates, volcanic ash (tuff), and sandstone.

Historical description
The formation was named by N. H. Darton "for the Brule Indians, who once roamed over Pine Rldge Ind. Res. in southern S. Dak., where the fm. covers large areas, and that it is not present in Brule Ind. Res., which occurs farther NE In S. Dak." Darton's first description stated, "The White River beds In their extension from S. Dak. Into Nebr. present some differences in strat. range and relations. They expand considerably and include, at top, beds which appear not to be represented in the typical regions. Accordingly, to afford distinct definitions for the members in Nebr. I have Introduced the designation Brule clay and separated the underlying Titanotherium beds as Chadron fm. The Brule consists mainly of a hard, sandy clay, of pale-pink color. Thickness about 600 ft. In vicinity of Wyo. line, but diminishes greatly eastward; in vicinity of 103° mer. in NW. comer of Nebr. it is 320 ft. Has not been recognized E. of long. 101°30', where it appears to sink beneath the surface In Platte Valley. Extends far to NB. in So. Dak. Is upper fm. of White River group." N. H. Darton, 1898 (D, 8, G, S, 19th Ann, Eept., p t 4, pp. 736, 766–759). (Abbreviations are in source document.)

Fossil record
The most important fossils sites are:
Fitterer Ranch
Obritsch Ranch
M&M Ranch
Little Badlands in Stark County, ND
Chalky Buttes (including White Butte) in Slope County, ND

Prehistoric catfish, several mammals such as nimravids and Hesperocyon, and sunfish fossils are known from the Brule Formation in Badlands National Park.

Notable among the local fauna are Bathornithid birds, ranging from the highly varied wetland-dwelling Bathornis species to the gigantic Paracrax.

Fauna

See also

References

Paleogene United States
Oligocene paleontological sites of North America
Rupelian Stage
Paleogene Colorado
Paleogene geology of Nebraska
Paleogene geology of North Dakota
Paleogene geology of South Dakota
Paleogene geology of Wyoming
Badlands National Park